Old Town is an area of Barnsley in South Yorkshire, England.  It is also the name of a ward of Barnsley Metropolitan Borough Council.

References

Geography of Barnsley